Haarlem Spaarnwoude is a railway station in Haarlem, Netherlands. It is located east of the Haarlem city centre and south of Spaarnwoude, on the Amsterdam–Rotterdam railway. The N200 road (from Amsterdam to Haarlem) runs parallel to the railway on the south side. The station opened on 24 May 1998. On the north side of the station is an IKEA store.

Train services
As of 9 December 2018, the following train services call at this station:

National rail

Bus services

Tracks and platforms
The station is on a line with two tracks, and has no additional tracks and no railroad switches. Track 1 in on the south, for the direction Amsterdam, and track 2 on the north, for the direction Haarlem. Each track has its own platform. From the north side there is an entrance to the north platform through a footbridge over a ditch; from the bus stop on the north side of the N200 there is an entrance to the south platform through a footbridge over another ditch. There is a footbridge over the railway and the N200. It has three stairways: to each platform and at the south side of the N200. These entrances and footbridges are at the west end of the platforms. The platforms extend eastwards to under the Kegge Viaduct.

External links
NS website 
Dutch public transport travel planner 

Railway stations in North Holland
Railway stations opened in 1998
Railway stations on the Oude Lijn
Buildings and structures in Haarlem